= Moncus Park =

Public green space in Lafayette, Louisiana

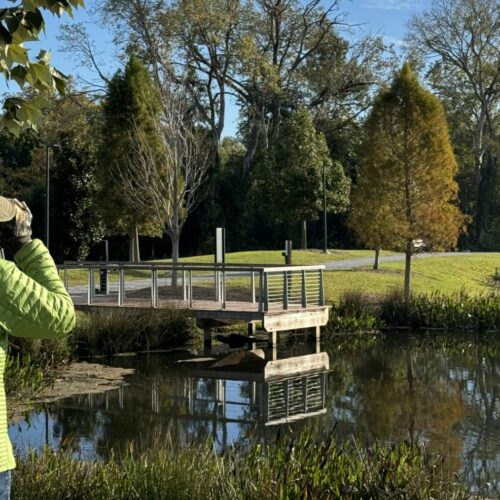
- Lake Reaux
- Interactive map of Moncus Park
- Location: Lafayette, Louisiana
- Coordinates: 30°12′05″N 92°02′22″W
- Area: 100-acres
- Administrator: Lafayette Central Park, Inc
- Visitors: 500,000 annual visits (in 2024)
- Status: Open all year
- Water: Lake Reaux and Coulee Mine
- Parking: Yes (paid)
- Public transit: Northbound bus: Johnston St & Riverstone Apartments stop. Southbound bus: Johnston St & Cycle Gear
- Website: moncuspark.org

Moncus Park is a public green space located in central Lafayette, Louisiana. The site was formerly known as the “Horse Farm” when it was owned by the University of Louisiana at Lafayette (formerly USL) and used for agricultural education, planting trials, and ROTC training before remaining largely undeveloped.

The park’s transformation began in 2005 with a community-led campaign, called "Save the Horse Farm", which aimed to preserve the land from commercial development. In 2012, the campaign achieved success, when the city reached agreement to purchase the property. A year later a nonprofit entity, formed as Lafayette Central Park, Inc, undertook planning and fundraising for a master-plan-based park.

The international landscape architecture firm Design Workshop developed the master plan after consulting with thousands of local residents and incorporated many features such as native tree and flower species, restored wetlands, a dog park, children's playground, amphitheater, a Veteran's Memorial and a few walking paths or trails.
